The Macau International Marathon is an annual road running event held in the special administrative region of Macau adjacent to mainland China, since 1981. The marathon begins and ends at the Olympic Sports Centre Stadium.

History 

The event was first held in 1981 under the organisation of the Panda Running Club and was the first international marathon to be held in the region. The Macau Athletic Association took over organisational duties in 1987 and the race was accepted as a member of the AIMS Racing Group in 1990.

In 1997, the annual marathon race was suspended due to the opening of the Macau Olympic Stadium, but a half marathon was held for the first time in its place that year, maintaining the race continuity.

In 2012, marathoners ran up to an additional  due to a marshalling error, and many half marathoners also ran about  more than intended due to a number of issues.

Course 

The course begins and ends at the Olympic Sports Centre Stadium, and traverses the Taipa and Hengqin islands as well as the Cotai zone.

Sponsorship 

The event is sponsored by Galaxy Entertainment Group, a casino and hotel investment company.

Participation 

The marathon race attracts a majority of overseas runners, with average yearly totals of around 500 entrants and 400 finishers. The marathon's participation record was achieved in 1984, with 1121 runners starting the race and 932 of them finishing. The shorter distances are more popular with both Macau and foreign athletes. Since its introduction in 1997, the half marathon has gone from 348 finishers to a record high of 1279 finishers in 2006. The mini-marathon was inaugurated a year after the half marathon and instantly gained high participation (1111 runners took part in 1997 and a high of 1767 participants was reached in 2009).

In addition to the large numbers of amateur runners who take part in the event, the marathon features elite level runners from East Asia, Africa and Europe.

Winners 

Key:
  Course record (in bold)
  Held as half marathon

Wins by country

Notes

References

List of winners
Gasparovic, Juraj (2011-12-05). Macau Marathon. Association of Road Racing Statisticians. Retrieved on 2011-12-24.
Former Winners. Macau Marathon (2011). Retrieved on 2011-12-24.

External links

Marathons in China
Sport in Macau
Recurring sporting events established in 1981
1981 establishments in Macau